The 1909 South Carolina Gamecocks football team represented the University of South Carolina as an independent during the 1909 college football season. Led by Christie Benet in his fourth and final season as head coach, South Carolina compiled a record of 2–6.

Schedule

References

South Carolina
South Carolina Gamecocks football seasons
South Carolina Gamecocks football